George Hardie (born February 19, 1953) is a former professional tennis player from the United States.

Career
Hardie went to college at Southern Methodist University and was runner-up to Billy Martin in the 1975 NCAA Division One final. He had dropped just one game in winning the first two sets, but lost the match in five.

He also lost to Billy Martin at the Arkansas International Tennis Tournament that year. It would remain the only final that he reached on the Grand Prix tennis circuit. He made semi-finals at Baltimore in 1978 (where he defeated Adriano Panatta) and Costa Rica in 1979. His quarter-final appearances included Stockholm in 1977, Guadalajara in 1978, Philadelphia in 1979 (where he had a win over Ilie Năstase), Palm Harbor in 1980 and San Juan in 1981.

Hardie appeared in the main singles draw of 16 Grand Slam tournaments over the course of his career but won just three of his matches.

Post tennis
Hardie settled in Dallas, Texas and is involved in the wind technology industry.

Grand Prix/WCT career finals

Singles: 1 (0–1)

Doubles: 2 (1–1)

Challenger titles

Doubles: (1)

References

External links
 
 

1953 births
Living people
American male tennis players
Tennis people from California
SMU Mustangs men's tennis players